International Liaison Department may refer to:

 International Liaison Department of the Chinese Communist Party
 International Liaison Department (Comintern)